Ashlee Vance (born 1977) is an American business columnist and author. His biography of Elon Musk, titled Elon Musk: Tesla, SpaceX, and the Quest for a Fantastic Future, was released on May 19, 2015. He lives with his wife Melinda and their two children Bowie and Tucker.

Early life and education 
Vance was born in 1977 in South Africa. He attended Pomona College, graduating in 2000.

Career
Vance wrote for The Register from March 2003 to August 2008. He moved to The New York Times in September 2008 and then to Bloomberg Businessweek in January 2011. Vance covered companies such as IBM, HP, Intel, and Dell, and also writes about a wide range of technology topics, including robots, Segway scooters, and the R programming language.

In 2007, Vance wrote a book, called Geek Silicon Valley, on the history of Silicon Valley. His writing often also appears in such publications as The Economist, Chicago Tribune, CNN.com, The Globe and Mail, the International Herald Tribune, and CNET.

Vance hosted an audio podcast called Semi-Coherent Computing from 2007–2008, in which he discussed enterprise computing topics such as Datacenter cooling and blade servers, and interviewed guests including chip pioneer David Ditzel of Transmeta, Sun Microsystems, and Bell Labs.

In 2015, Vance started writing and hosting the "Hello World" video series for Bloomberg, focusing on the tech scene in various countries. In the same year, he published his biography about Elon Musk, the CEO of Tesla, SpaceX and other tech companies.

Works

References

External links
Vance's web site 

1977 births
Living people
American business and financial journalists
St. John's School (Texas) alumni
American people of South African descent
Pomona College alumni
21st-century American biographers
21st-century American journalists
American male biographers
American male journalists
21st-century American male writers
The New York Times writers
Bloomberg L.P. people